Følle is a suburb of Rønde in Syddjurs Municipality, Denmark.

References

Villages in Denmark
Populated places in Central Denmark Region
Syddjurs Municipality